Abubakar Aliyevich Suleymanov (born 7 May 1991) is a Russian boxer. He is a former Moscow Boxing champion. He is a participant in the Boxing World Cup, and renowned champion of Russia in fights HFC.

Early life 
Suleymanov was born on 7 May 1991 in Grozny, Republic of Chechnya, Russia. He studied at Grebenskaya secondary school.

In 2002, Abubakar got involved in sports and went to the sambo section in his hometown. After a year of training, he won the championship of the Shchelkovo region in SAMBO. That year he began boxing training under coach Paizulaev Kakhir Izvailovich.

Events 
2003 – The championship of the republic among novices (2nd place).

2003 – All-Russian tournament (class B) in the city of Essentuki (1st place-the winner of the All-Russian tournament).

2004 – Tournament in Astrakhan (1st place).

2004 – Russian Youth Championship (2nd place)

2005 – Championship of the Chechen Republic in boxing (1st place)

2006 – Moved to Moscow and began playing in CSK under the guidance of Dmitry Grigoryevich Karakash and Alexander Dorzhievich Dugarov. Moscow Boxing Championship for Senior boys (1st) and Russian Championship for Senior Boys (1st).

2007 – Moscow Boxing Championship for cadets (1st place).

2007 – The third summer Sports Contest among Russian students in Penza (1st place).

2007 – Russian Championship among the Armed Forces (1st place).

2008 – Russian Championship (1st place). He joined the Russian national boxing team, thanks to which he participated in the World Boxing Championship in Mexico (3rd) 91+ kg. Russian Boxing Cup (1st).

2010 – International boxing tournament in Grozny as part of the Russian national team.

2011 – Moscow Boxing Championship (1st place).

2020 – Won second round match by knockout. In November 2020 he won in the 1st round. In December 2020, won first belt of the league in the category up to 84 kg. becoming the champion according to the HFC version.

References 

Living people
1991 births
Russian male boxers
Sportspeople from Grozny